Dermot O’Meara was Dean of Cashel from 1605 until 1606:  a former Roman Catholic, he returned to that faith when Chapter and Crown both nominated alternative candidates to succeed him.

References

Deans of Cashel
17th-century Irish Anglican priests